The 1974 Miami Redskins football team was an American football team that represented Miami University during the 1974 NCAA Division I football season. In their first season under head coach Dick Crum, the Redskins won the Mid-American Conference (MAC) championship, compiled a 10–0–1 record (5–0 against MAC opponents), outscored all opponents by a combined total of 303 to 86, defeated Georgia, by a score of 21–10 in the 1974 Tangerine Bowl, and were ranked #10 in the final AP Poll.

The team's statistical leaders included quarterback Steve Sanna with 724 passing yards, fullback Randy Walker with 873 rushing yards, and Jack Schulte with 352 receiving yards.

Schedule

References

Miami
Miami RedHawks football seasons
Mid-American Conference football champion seasons
Citrus Bowl champion seasons
College football undefeated seasons
Miami Redskins football